Szabolcs Üveges (born 29 April 1991) is a Hungarian midfielder who currently plays for Várda SE.

External links
 Player profile at HLSZ 

1991 births
Living people
People from Kalocsa
Hungarian footballers
Association football midfielders
Újpest FC players
Parma Calcio 1913 players
Putnok VSE footballers
Kisvárda FC players
Nemzeti Bajnokság I players
Hungarian expatriate footballers
Expatriate footballers in Italy
Hungarian expatriate sportspeople in Italy
Sportspeople from Bács-Kiskun County